He Weirong (born October 1949) is a retired lieutenant general (zhong jiang) of the People's Liberation Army Air Force (PLAAF) of China. He served as Chief of Staff and then Executive Deputy Commander of the PLAAF.

Biography
He Weirong was born in October 1949 in Yichang, Hubei Province. He joined the PLAAF in 1966 and studied at the Air Force aviation school. In 1999 he graduated from the corps-level officer training program at PLA National Defence University.

He commanded the Sixth Fighter Division and was deputy commander of the Jinan Military Region and commander of the Jinan MR Air Force (2003). He was appointed PLAAF chief of staff in 2003, before assuming his current position in 2005. As executive deputy commander of the PLAAF, He was responsible for operations and training.

He attained the rank of major general in 1993, and lieutenant general in June 2004.

References

1949 births
Living people
People's Liberation Army Air Force generals
People's Liberation Army generals from Hubei
People from Yichang
PLA National Defence University alumni